Ernst Arndt may refer to:

 Ernst Arndt (actor) (1861–1942), German/Austrian actor
 Ernst Moritz Arndt (1769–1860), German patriotic author